SS Francis Preston Blair was an American Liberty ship, 7,196 tons stranded on Saumarez Reef in the Coral Sea during a cyclone in 1945.  The ship has since deteriorated into a rusty heap.  The wreck was used by Royal Australian Air Force F-111 aircraft for target practice during the 1980s.

The bronze propeller was salvaged by unknown persons between 1964 and 1970. Wreck was visited by Wild Kingdom who made a TV episode hosted by Marlin Perkins for USA and world distribution in 1971.

Francis Preston Blair was operated during World War II by Sudden & Christenson Company under charter ships from the Maritime Commission and War Shipping Administration. She was unloading troops and supplies at off Queensland, Australia before the grounding.

See also
World War II United States Merchant Navy

External links

References 

Liberty ships
Shipwrecks in the Coral Sea
Maritime incidents in July 1945
1943 ships